George Benton (May 15, 1933 – September 19, 2011) was an American boxer and boxing trainer from Philadelphia, Pennsylvania.

Boxing career

Fighting
His first amateur bout was when he was thirteen. He turned professional three years later. He boxed professionally from 1949 to 1970 and defeated future world champions Freddie Little, Jimmy Ellis, and Joey Giardello. In seventy-six professional fights, he was never knocked down and was stopped just twice, on a cut against Luis Manuel Rodriguez and when he didn't come out for the final round of his fight with Bennie Briscoe. Benton had a professional record of 62–13–1 (37 KOs).

Benton became the #1 ranked middleweight in the world in the early 1960s, but he never got a shot at the world title. In 1962, after he beat Giardello, Benton thought that he would get a title shot. However, Giardello's manager, Lou Duva, was well connected and was able to get Giardello a fight with Dick Tiger for the World Middleweight Championship, which Giardello won by decision. "Yeah, I screwed George out of his shot," Duva said. "He didn't even know about it till I told him many years later."

Benton's boxing career ended in 1970 after he was shot. The shooter had tried to pick up Benton's sister in a bar, and Benton's brother beat him up. Vowing to kill someone from the Benton family, the man shot George in the back. He was in and out of the hospital for two years. The bullet remained lodged near Benton's spine for the remainder of his life.

Training
With his boxing career over, he turned to training. He studied under Eddie Futch and was in Joe Frazier's corner for his third fight with Muhammad Ali, the Thrilla in Manila. He was also in the corner of Leon Spinks when he upset Ali to win the World Heavyweight Championship.

For seventeen years, Benton worked with Lou Duva and the Duva family's promotion company, Main Events, as the head trainer for many of their fighters. Among the fighters he trained were Evander Holyfield, Oliver McCall, Mike McCallum, Meldrick Taylor, and Pernell Whitaker. Also he coached Marvis Frazier during his amateur career.

Personal life
Benton died on September 19, 2011 after a battle with pneumonia. A veteran of the United States Army, he was buried at the Washington Crossing National Cemetery  in Upper Makefield Township, Bucks County, Pennsylvania.

Legacy
In 1989 and 1990, Benton was named "Trainer of the Year" by the Boxing Writers Association of America.

In 2001, he was elected to the International Boxing Hall Of Fame.

Professional boxing record

References

External links
  Sports Illustrated "The Master"
 Boxing Writers Association of America Trainer of the Year Award
 George Benton International Boxing Hall of Fame
 George Benton's Professional Record 

1933 births
2011 deaths
Boxers from Pennsylvania
Middleweight boxers
American boxing trainers
American male boxers